Nirmalamma (18 July 1920 – 19 February 2009) was an Indian actress in the Telugu cinema. She has acted in more than 800 films. She was well known for her grandmother roles in several films.She won two Nandi Awards.

Early life
She was born in Machilipatnam, Madras Presidency, British India.

Film career
Her debut film was Garuda Garvabhangam in 1950. Nirmalamma has worked along with almost all famous artists in Telugu Cinema like NTR, ANR, Krishna, S. V. Ranga Rao, Rajendra Prasad, P. B. Srinivas, Chiranjeevi, Nandamuri Balakrishna, Venkatesh [Nagarjuna akkineni] and  many more. She is one of the artists who appears in almost all of the movies of S. V. Krishna Reddy and E. V. V. Satyanarayana. In a career spanning over five decades, she worked in over 700 films and bagged Nandi award for best supporting actress for her role in ‘Mayuri’. Her roles in films like ‘Sankarabharanam’, ‘Yamagola’, ‘Padaharella Vayasu’, ‘Swathi Muthyam’, ‘Maavi Chiguru’ and ‘Subha Sankalpam’ remain unforgettable. She has had memorable roles in the films Chinnodu Peddodu, Padaharella Vayasu, Kanakamahalakshmi Recording Dance Troupe, Gang Leader, Mayalodu, Egirey Paavurama, Rendilla Poojari, Devatha (Shoban babu's movie), Chinnarayudu, Dalapathi, Alibaba Aradajanu Dongalu, Sitharatnam Gaari Abbayi, Mamagaaru, Aa Okkati Adakku, Karthavyam, Chalaki Mogudu and Chadastapu Pellam.

She has established Nirmala Arts and produced Chalaki Mogudu Chadasthapu Pellam, starring Rajendra Prasad, directed by Relangi Narasimha Rao.

Her last movie was Premaku Swagatham, directed by famous director S. V. Krishna Reddy. Her last public appearance was at the Vajrothsava celebrations of Telugu cinema where many celebrities remembered her for the fact that she has played as mother/grandmother for many generations of Telugu Cinema.

Personal life
She had no children of her own, but adopted a daughter, Kavitha.

Awards
Nandi Awards
 1984 Best Supporting Actress - Mayuri
 1999 Best Character Actress - Seetharama Raju

Selected filmography
This is partial list of her films.

1950s
 Garuda Garvabhangam (1956)
 Paduka Pattabhishekam (1957)
 BhagyaDevatha (1959)

1960s
 Krishna Prema (1960) - Rukmini
 Bharya Bharthalu (1961)
 Kula Gothralu (1962)
 Devatha  (1964)
 Potti Pleader (1966)
 Sri Krishna Tulabharam (1966)  Devaki
 Deva kanya (1968)
 Ekaveera (1969)

1970s
 Thirumalai Thenkumari (1970)
 Naa Tammudu (1971)
 Attalu Kodallu (1971)
 Manchi Vallaki Manchivadu (1973)
 Devudu Chesina Manushulu (1973)
 Devudamma (1973)
 Nindu Kutumbam (1973)
 Samsara Saagaram (1973)
 Yamagola (1977)
 Chillarakottu Chittamma (1977)
 Padaharella Vayasu (1978) as Gangamma
 Sivaranjani (1978)
 Kothala Raayudu (1979)
 Sankarabharanam (1979)

1980s
 Mosagadu (1980)
 Agni Poolu (1981)
 Illantaa Sandadi (1982)
 Patnam Vachina Pativrathalu (1982)
 Kalavari Samsaram (1982)
 Subhalekha (1982)
 Kaliyuga Ramudu (1982)
 Sangharshana (1983)
 Manthri Gari Viyyankudu (1983) as Annapoornamma
 Maga Maharaju (1983)
 Mugguru Monagallu (1983)
 Rustum (1984)
 Mayuri (1984)
 Mahanagaramlo Mayagadu (1984)
 Hero (1984)
 Babai Abbai (1984) as Godaramma
 Oka Radha Iddaru Krishnulu (1985)
 Samsaram O Sangeetam (1985)
 Muchchataga Mugguru (1985)
 Swathi Muthyam (1985)
 Nireekshana (1986)
 Jailu Pakshi (1986)
 Aakrandana (1986)
 Naaku Pellam Kavali (1987)
 Sri Kanaka Mahalaxmi Recording Dance Troupe (1987) as Padi Sundaramma
 Vishwanatha Nayakudu (1987)
 Khaidi No.786 (1988)
 Aakhari Poratam (1988)
 Chinnodu Peddodu (1988)
 Varasudochhadu (1988)
 Siva (1989)
 Vijay (1989)
 Ajatha Satruvu as Kasulamma
 Chalaki Mogudu Chadastapu Pellam (1989)
 Gundammagaari Krishnulu

1990s
 Gang Leader (1991)
 Karthavyam (1991) as Mahalakshmi
 Thalapathi(1991)(Tamil)
 Killer (1991) as Subba Lakshmi
 Aapathbandhavudu (1992)
 Karuninchina Kanaka Durga (1992)
 Raat (1992)
 Sundarakanda (1992) 
 Chinarayudu (1992)
 Bava Bavamaridi (1993)
 Rakshana (1993)
 Aa Okkati Adakku (1993)
 Sh... Gup Chup (1993)
 Mayalodu (1993)
 Matru Devo Bhava (1993)
 Pekata Papa Rao (1993)
 Alibaba Aradajanu Dongalu (1994)
 Allari Premikudu (1994) as Lakshmi Devi
 Big Boss (1995)
Oru Oorla Oru Rajakumari (1995) (Tamil)
 Subha Sankalpam (1995) as Lakshmamma
Coimbatore Mappillai (1996) (Tamil)
 Soggadi Pellam (1996)
 Maavichiguru (1996)
 Egire Paavurama (1997) 
 Aahvaanam (1997)
 Aaro Pranam (1997)
 Raayudu (1998)
 Pandaga (1998)
 Seetharama Raju (1999)
 Sneham Kosam (1999)

2000s
 Premaku Swagatham (2002)
 Kodanda Ramudu (2000) as Saree weaver

References

External links
 

1920 births
2009 deaths
Actresses in Telugu cinema
Indian film actresses
People from Krishna district
Actresses from Andhra Pradesh
20th-century Indian actresses
21st-century Indian actresses
Nandi Award winners
People from Machilipatnam